Lauri Aus (4 November 1970 – 20 July 2003) was an Estonian professional cyclist who represented his native country at three consecutive Summer Olympics, starting in 1992.

Aus was born in Tartu and grew up in the village of Luua in Jõgeva County. His professional cycling career began in 1995 with the French cycling team Mutuelle de Seine-et-Marne. After four wins in 1996, he was signed to Casino the following year alongside countrman Jaan Kirsipuu. He remained with this team until his death, which was renamed the AG2R Citroën Team in 2000. Aus won a Tour du Limousin (1997), a Tour Poitou-Charentes en Nouvelle-Aquitaine (1998), Classic Haribo (1998) and a Grand Prix d'Isbergues (1999). In 1999, he was fifth at Milan–San Remo. In 2000, he became Estonian road champion.

In 1992, 1996 and 2000, Aus represented his home country at the Summer Olympic Games. At the 1992 Summer Olympic Games in Barcelona, he finished fifth in the road race.

On 20 July 2003, while cycling on the Aovere-Kallaste-Omedu road in Tartu County in preparation for a later race in Karksi-Nuia, he was struck from behind by an Opel Ascona. He died of his injuries en route to a hospital, aged thirty-two. He was buried at Raadi cemetery in Tartu. The driver of the vehicle was determined to have been be drunk and later sentenced to three and a half years imprisonment.

Since 2004, the Lauri Aus GP memorial cycling race is held annually at the Pirita-Kloostrimetsa race circuit, next to the Pirita Velodrome, in Tallinn in honour of Aus.

In July 2019, a memorial bench commemorating Aus was opened to the public in Aus' hometown of Luua, by Aus' parents, children, widow, first coach Kalev Raudsepp, and politician Aivar Kokk.

Major results

1992
 National Road Race Champion
5th Olympics Road Race
1994
 National time trial Champion
1997
1st Tour de Limousin, stage 3
1st Tour de Limousin, General Classification
1st Tour de Pologne, stage 1
1998
1st Classic Haribo
1st Tour de l'Oise, stage 1
2nd Tour de l'Oise, General Classification
1st Tour du Poitou-Charentes, stage 1
1st Tour du Poitou-Charentes, General Classification
3rd Tour de Limousin, General Classification
 National Road Race Champion
 National time trial Champion
2001
1st Tour du Poitou-Charentes, stage 4
3rd Tour du Poitou-Charentes, General Classification
2003
3rd Driedaagse van West-Vlaanderen, General Classification

References

External links
  http://www.cfc.ee/lauri-ausi-fond/lauri-aus
  https://web.archive.org/web/20100612000928/http://memoire-du-cyclisme.net/palmares/aus_lauri.php

1970 births
2003 deaths
Burials at Raadi cemetery
Estonian male cyclists
Cyclists at the 1992 Summer Olympics
Cyclists at the 1996 Summer Olympics
Cyclists at the 2000 Summer Olympics
Olympic cyclists of Estonia
Cycling road incident deaths
Sportspeople from Tartu
Road incident deaths in Estonia
Sport deaths in Estonia
20th-century Estonian people